The draw for the 2023 FIFA Women's World Cup took place at the Aotea Centre in Auckland, New Zealand on 22 October 2022. It determined the group stages for the 32 qualified competing teams at the Women's World Cup staged in Australia and New Zealand. The teams were divided into four pots of eight, with one team selected from each pot to form a group.

Co-hosts New Zealand and Australia were automatically placed in positions A1 and B1 respectively in pot 1, which also contained the six highest-ranked teams based upon the  October 2022 FIFA Women's World Rankings. The next eight highest-ranked teams were placed into pot 2, while the next eight highest-ranked teams allocated into pot 3. Pot 4 was formed by the five lowest-ranked ranked teams in the tournament, along with three placeholders for the winners of the inter-confederation play-offs.

The draw sequences began with pot 1 and ended with pot 4.

Personnel Involved
The draw was attended by 800 guests including FIFA President Gianni Infantino, FIFA Secretary General Fatma Samoura, Prime Minister Jacinda Ardern and Australian Federal Minister for Sport Anika Wells. Representatives from all 29 qualified teams, as well as representatives of the 10 remaining play-off teams were in attendance.

The draw was led by Carli Lloyd and Amanda Davies, assisted by Maia Jackman (New Zealand), Julie Dolan (Australia), Zoi Sadowski-Synnott (New Zealand), Cate Campbell (Australia), Geremi (Cameroon), Alexi Lalas (USA), Gilberto Silva (Brazil) and Ian Wright (England).

Seeding
Teams were seeded using the October 2022 FIFA Women's World Rankings (shown in parentheses).

Notes
 H : Hosts

Final draw
The eight groups were formed randomly and selected one team from each of the four pots. Two teams from the same confederation could not be drawn into the same group, with the exception of Europe, where at most two teams could be in the same group. Co-hosts New Zealand and Australia were the only seeds that were predetermined, with the teams placed in positions A1 and B1 respectively.

Notes

References

2023 FIFA Women's World Cup